Stig Håkan Mild (born 14 June 1971) is a Swedish former professional footballer who played as a central midfielder. He is best remembered for his time with IFK Göteborg, with which he won four Swedish Championships. A full international between 1991 and 2001, he won a total of 74 caps for the Sweden national team and was a part of the Sweden team that finished third at the 1994 FIFA World Cup. He also represented his country at the 1992 Summer Olympics and UEFA Euro 2000.

Club career 
Born in Trollhättan, Västra Götaland, Mild started his career with the local club Trollhättans FK, and was early on scouted by the at that time leading Swedish club IFK Göteborg which he joined in 1988. He made his debut in the first team of IFK Göteborg the same year, in a friendly match against IF Elfsborg, 29 September. He played his first league game the following season, when he came on as a substitute against Halmstads BK, 26 July. He then scored his first goal in a competitive match in 1990, and became Swedish champion for the first time that same year, playing in a majority of the club's matches during the season.

He became a regular in the team and won another championship title the next season, as well as winning Svenska Cupen. He also scored his first goal in Allsvenskan in 1991, and played four matches in the European Cup. He was at the time a member of the Swedish Olympic team that competed at the 1992 Summer Olympics, where he played all four matches. He returned to European football and played all ten matches in the 1992–93 UEFA Champions League, against amongst others A.C. Milan and FC Porto. Mild also scored a goal against Lech Poznań in the qualifying round of the tournament. He became Swedish champion with IFK again in 1993.

Håkan Mild then moved abroad to Swiss club Servette FC where he won the Swiss Super League title the first season. He then played in the 1994 World Cup, where he was substituted on in two games, and played the last three games—quarter-final, semi-final and third place match—from start scoring one goal and assisting one. He returned to Servette FC to play another season but his first visit on the continent was not very successful and he returned to IFK Göteborg for the second half of the 1995 season. He led the club to another Swedish Championship the following season, but left the club again, this time to play in Spain and Real Sociedad.

He played 49 matches in Primera Division over two seasons, and was a member of the squad that finished third in 1997–98, the club's best result during the 1990s. He returned home to Gothenburg and IFK a second time, but had to tamper with injury problems the second half of 1998. He played another three seasons before trying his luck in another club abroad, this time Wimbledon F.C. in England. This proved to be his least successful stay abroad, playing only nine matches over a little more than one season. The low, but undisclosed, fee for his transfer to Wimbledon gave Mild a bad conscience, so he chose to not accept the almost 500,000 SEK (around US$50,000 at that time) of match bonuses he had not yet been paid. This, amongst other things, has given Håkan Mild a special status amongst the IFK fans.

He returned in time to help IFK stay in Allsvenskan during the worst season of the club since 1976—when the club played in Division 2—as they barely avoided relegation by winning a play-off after the season's end. Mild then played another three seasons, partially interrupted by injury problems. He played his last match 11 December 2005 home against FC Lyn Oslo in the Royal League tournament, and his name was sung during all 90 minutes of the match, as a final farewell. He then assumed the position of director of sports in the club.

He played a total of 459 matches over 18 years for IFK Göteborg, and is regarded as one of the club's greatest players ever not only due to his work on the field, but also for his club spirit, leader qualities and work ethics. He has only represented one Swedish club on higher levels, and statements such as "IFK is my home" and "IFK has always meant so much to me that it sometimes has become a problem" has only cemented the view on him amongst supporters as one of the greatest.

International career 
He played 74 games for the Swedish national team, scoring eight goals, and besides participation in the 1994 FIFA World Cup and the 1992 Summer Olympics, he also played in Euro 2000.

Personal life 
In 2001, he did a running test called the Pacer test and scored a record high of 19.2 which is the best ever recorded.

Career statistics

Club

International 

Scores and results list Sweden's goal tally first, score column indicates score after each Mild goal.

Honours 
IFK Göteborg
 Allsvenskan: 1990, 1991, 1993, 1996
 Svenska Cupen: 1991
 Royal League runner-up: 2004–05
Sweden
 FIFA World Cup third-place: 1994

References 
 Göransson, Mattias (2005). Blåvit gryning. Göteborg: Offside Fanatik. 
 UEFA.com (2005). IFK hero Mild gets his due. Retrieved 27 June 2006.
 Fagerlin, Hans (July 2006). Överkörd på mitten av Mild. Blått&Vitt, 6.

Notes

External links 
 
 
 

1971 births
Living people
People from Trollhättan
Swedish footballers
Sweden international footballers
Sweden youth international footballers
Swedish expatriate footballers
Swedish expatriate sportspeople in Spain
Swedish expatriate sportspeople in England
Allsvenskan players
IFK Göteborg players
Servette FC players
La Liga players
Real Sociedad footballers
Wimbledon F.C. players
Olympic footballers of Sweden
Footballers at the 1992 Summer Olympics
1994 FIFA World Cup players
UEFA Euro 2000 players
Expatriate footballers in Switzerland
Expatriate footballers in Spain
Expatriate footballers in England
Association football midfielders
Swiss Super League players
English Football League players
IFK Göteborg directors and chairmen
Sportspeople from Västra Götaland County